Oscar Williams (born 1932) is an Antiguan cricketer. He played in two first-class matches for the Leeward Islands in 1958/59 and 1959/60.

See also
 List of Leeward Islands first-class cricketers

References

External links
 

1932 births
Living people
Antigua and Barbuda cricketers
Leeward Islands cricketers